College of Eastern Idaho is a public community college in Idaho Falls, Idaho. It was founded in 1969 as Eastern Idaho Vocational Technical School and later became a technical college called Eastern Idaho Technical College. In May 2017, Bonneville County residents voted to create a community college district, allowing Eastern Idaho Technical College to become a community college. In July 2017, the Idaho State Board of Education appointed five community college trustees and completed the transition to community college.

The college's divisions include Business, Office, and Technology; Health Professions; Trades and Industry; and General Education. Eastern Idaho Technical College also offers courses in adult basic education, GED testing and workforce training. Currently, the College of Eastern Idaho also awards an Associate of Arts degree in Liberal Arts, which is designed to serve students seeking to continue their education at a four-year university.

The district of the College of Eastern Idaho includes only Bonneville County. On November 7, 2017, voters in Bingham County had the opportunity to join the community college district. However, the proposal was defeated.

Enrollment as of summer 2018 stood at 1,300 students.

References

External links
 Official website

Buildings and structures in Idaho Falls, Idaho
Educational institutions established in 1969
Universities and colleges accredited by the Northwest Commission on Colleges and Universities
Education in Bonneville County, Idaho
1969 establishments in Idaho
Community colleges in Idaho